Joseph Snively Hedges (1836 – 1910) was a Union Army soldier during the American Civil War. He received the Medal of Honor for gallantry as a First Lieutenant in the 4th U.S. Cavalry for action on December 17, 1864 near Harpeth River, Tennessee.

Medal of Honor citation
“At the head of his regiment charged a field battery with strong infantry supports, broke the enemy's line, and, with other mounted troops, captured three guns and many prisoners.”

See also
 4th U.S. Cavalry
 List of American Civil War Medal of Honor recipients: G-L

Notes

References

 
 .

External links
 

1836 births
1910 deaths
American Civil War recipients of the Medal of Honor
People of Ohio in the American Civil War
Union Army soldiers
United States Army Medal of Honor recipients